Government Secondary School Usha Kadu is a public secondary school located at a suburb of Mararaba-Udege, Nasarawa State, Nigeria.

See also

 Education in Nigeria
 List of schools in Nigeria

Educational institutions with year of establishment missing
Nasarawa State
Government schools in Nigeria
Secondary schools in Nigeria